The Freedom Alliance Party of Liberia (FAPL) is a political party in Liberia. It fielded candidates in the 11 October 2005 elections.

FAPL candidate Margaret Tor-Thompson won 0.9% of the vote in the presidential poll. The party failed to win any seats in the Senate or House of Representatives.

In the Liberian elections of 2011 the party nominated Togba-Nah Tipoteh for president.

Political parties in Liberia